Maxim Alexander Baldry is an English actor. He began his career as a child actor in the film Mr. Bean's Holiday (2007). More recently, he is known for his roles in the Channel 4 soap opera Hollyoaks (2016–2017) and miniseries Years and Years (2019), and the Amazon Prime fantasy series The Lord of the Rings: The Rings of Power (2022–).

Early life 
Baldry was born in Redhill, Surrey to an English father from Leicestershire and a Russian-Armenian mother from Moscow; his parents met while his father was working in Eastern Europe. Baldry spent his early childhood in Moscow and Warsaw, and spoke Russian as his first language, before returning to England. He attended Hurtwood House, completing A Levels in English, history, and theatre studies in 2014. He began his studies in literature at the University of Edinburgh, but withdrew.

Career 
In 2007, Baldry starred as Stepan Duchevsky in the comedy film Mr. Bean's Holiday alongside Rowan Atkinson, for which Baldry received a Young Artist Award nomination, and played Caesarion in the HBO historical drama Rome. He returned to acting nearly a decade later when he was cast as Liam Donovan in the Channel 4 soap opera Hollyoaks, a role he played from 2016 to 2017. He then appeared in the Syfy television film Lake Placid: Legacy.

Baldry played Viktor Goraya in Russell T Davies' 2019 Channel 4 miniseries Years and Years and Ed in the film Last Christmas. The following year, he guest starred as John Polidori in the Doctor Who series 12 episode The Haunting of Villa Diodati and appeared in Strike Back: Vendetta on Sky One. After circling a role in the Amazon Prime Video prequel to The Lord of the Rings for several months, he was confirmed to have joined the ensemble cast in December 2020. The series premiered in 2022, with Baldry playing Isildur.

Filmography

Awards and nominations

References

External links 
 

Living people
21st-century English male actors
English expatriates in Poland
English expatriates in Russia
English male child actors
English male film actors
English male television actors
English male soap opera actors
English people of Armenian descent
English people of Russian descent
Male actors from Buckinghamshire
Male actors from Surrey
People educated at Hurtwood House
People from Redhill, Surrey
Year of birth missing (living people)